Cemal Nalga (born 16 September 1987) is a Turkish professional basketball player for Balıkesir Büyükşehir Belediyespor of the Turkish Basketball First League(TBL). He plays the center position.

Jersey scandal
Nalga is also known for a major scandal in Turkish Professional Basketball. At the beginning of the 2009–2010 season, Cemal Nalga (who is also a basketball player on Galatasaray Café Crown) got a five match suspension during 23 September 2009 match against Cibona Zagreb. But, he later played in a friendly match against EnBW Ludwigsburg and Deutsche Bank Skyliners and wore the uniform of his good friend Tufan's number 7. He also been with Tufan Ersöz name in matches list. Nalga later received a two-year suspension in Turkey. Tufan also received a four-month suspension for his actions.

For the 2014–15 season he signed with Pınar Karşıyaka.

On September 3, 2019, he has signed with Petkim Spor of the TBL.

On August 27, 2020, he has signed with Balıkesir Büyükşehir Belediyespor of the Turkish Basketball First League(TBL).

Awards

National
 2005 FIBA Europe Under-18 Championship - 
 2009 Mediterranean Games - 
 2013 Mediterranean Games -

References

External links
 Profile at tbl.org.tr 
 TBLStat.net Profile 

1987 births
Living people
Afyonkarahisar Belediyespor players
Alba Berlin players
Bahçeşehir Koleji S.K. players
Bandırma B.İ.K. players
BC Rytas players
Beşiktaş men's basketball players
Centers (basketball)
Competitors at the 2009 Mediterranean Games
Competitors at the 2013 Mediterranean Games
Eskişehir Basket players
Galatasaray S.K. (men's basketball) players
İstanbul Büyükşehir Belediyespor basketball players
Karşıyaka basketball players
Mediterranean Games bronze medalists for Turkey
Mediterranean Games gold medalists for Turkey
Mediterranean Games medalists in basketball
Petkim Spor players
Sportspeople from İzmir
Tuborg Pilsener basketball players
Türk Telekom B.K. players
Turkish expatriate basketball people
Turkish expatriate basketball people in Germany
Turkish expatriate sportspeople in Lithuania
Turkish men's basketball players